Chris Gordon (born February 16, 1970) is an American former professional ice hockey goaltender.

Early life 
Gordon was born in Grand Rapids, Michigan. He attended University of Michigan from 1990 to 1994, where he played NCAA Division I college hockey with the Michigan Wolverines men's ice hockey team.

Career 
Gordon began his professional career in 1994 by joining the Huntington Blizzard of the ECHL. In his first year with the Blizzard his outstanding play was recognized when he was selected as the ECHL Goaltender of the Year and was named to the 1994–95 ECHL First All-Star Team.

Gordon helped backstop the El Paso Buzzards to capture the WPHL President's Cup as Western Professional Hockey League's Playoff Champions for both the 1996–97 and 1997–98 WPHL seasons.

Awards and honors

References

External links

1970 births
American men's ice hockey goaltenders
Anaheim Bullfrogs players
Detroit Vipers players
El Paso Buzzards players
Flint Generals players
Huntington Blizzard players
Living people
Michigan Wolverines men's ice hockey players
Omaha Lancers players
Waterloo Black Hawks players
Worcester IceCats players